Claude Prosser Clegg (14 July 1913 – 25 September 1991) was a New Zealand javelin thrower, who represented his country at the 1950 British Empire Games.

Early life and family
Born in Ōpunake on 14 July 1913, Clegg was the son of Sydney Rosina May Prosser and her husband Samuel James Clegg. In 1940, he married Jean Lorraine Bassett, and the couple went on to have two children.

Athletics
Clegg won the New Zealand national javelin title five times: in 1936, 1938, 1947, 1948, and 1949.

In later years, Clegg competed in masters athletics, and set a national record in the M70 javelin in 1985.

Death
A retired headmaster, Clegg died on 25 September 1991, and was buried at Ōpunake Cemetery.

References

1913 births
1991 deaths
People from Ōpunake
Commonwealth Games competitors for New Zealand
Athletes (track and field) at the 1950 British Empire Games
New Zealand male javelin throwers
New Zealand masters athletes
20th-century New Zealand people